Timo Werner (born 6 March 1996) is a German professional footballer who plays as a striker for Bundesliga club RB Leipzig and the Germany national team. 

Werner began his senior club career in 2013 playing for VfB Stuttgart, becoming the club's youngest debutant and youngest ever goalscorer. He signed with RB Leipzig in 2016, aged 20, in a then club record transfer worth €10 million, where he set the record as the youngest player to reach 150 and 200 appearances in the Bundesliga. Werner also finished as the league's second highest goalscorer in the 2019–20 season. After becoming Leipzig's all-time top goalscorer, Werner departed to Chelsea in 2020 for a reported fee worth €50 million, winning the UEFA Champions League in his first season at the club. He later returned to Leipzig in August 2022 for a reported £25.3 million.

A German international, Werner was a prolific goalscorer at youth international level for Germany, scoring 34 goals in 48 appearances across the various age group levels. Werner made his senior debut in 2017 and helped Germany win the 2017 FIFA Confederations Cup, winning the Golden Boot as the tournament's highest goalscorer. He also represented Germany at the 2018 FIFA World Cup and UEFA Euro 2020.

Early life
Werner was born in Stuttgart, Baden-Württemberg to Günther Schuh, a footballer, and Sabine Werner.

Club career

VfB Stuttgart

Werner played for TSV Steinhaldenfeld before joining VfB Stuttgart's academy in 2002. During the 2012–13 season, he was promoted to the U-19 team despite only being 16-years old at the time. He scored 24 goals that season and was rewarded for his form when he won the Gold U-17 Fritz Walter Medal in 2013.

Werner made his senior debut later that year in a 2013–14 UEFA Europa League qualifying phase match against PFC Botev Plovdiv. Upon doing so, he became the youngest player to ever play in an official match for Stuttgart at the age of 17 years, four months and 25 days, breaking the record previously held by Gerhard Poschner. In the following weeks he also became Stuttgart's youngest ever player in the Bundesliga and in the DFB-Pokal, and youngest ever goalscorer after netting his first goal for the club against Eintracht Frankfurt. He broke another record on 10 November when he scored a brace in a 3–1 win over SC Freiburg, thereby becoming the youngest player in Bundesliga history to score two goals in one game.

On his 18th birthday Werner signed a professional contract until June 2018 with VfB Stuttgart. He went on to score 13 goals in 95 league appearances, during which time he became the youngest player to make 50 Bundesliga appearances in the competition's history. The record was later broken by Kai Havertz in 2018. Stuttgart were relegated in May 2016 which prompted him to join newly promoted club RB Leipzig the following month.

RB Leipzig

On 11 June 2016, Werner agreed to a four-year contract with RB Leipzig for a reported transfer fee of €10 million, the largest in the club's history. On 26 September 2016, he became the youngest player to play in 100 Bundesliga matches when he appeared in a fixture against 1. FC Köln at the age of 20 years and 203 days. In doing so, he bettered the record previously held by Julian Draxler by 22 days, although he was again surpassed by Havertz in 2019. Werner ended the 2016–17 Bundesliga season with 21 goals, making him the leading German goalscorer in the division, and helped RB Leipzig qualify for the UEFA Champions League for the first time in the club's history.

In March 2018, in a match against his former club, Stuttgart, Werner became the youngest player to reach the milestone of 150 Bundesliga appearances, eclipsing the record previously held by Charly Körbel. Later that month he helped Leipzig defeat Bayern Munich for the first time ever when he scored the winning goal in a 2–1 victory. He ultimately went on to score 13 goals and record seven assists for the season.

On 7 October 2018, Werner scored two goals in a 6–0 league win over 1. FC Nürnberg, the first of which was his 50th Bundesliga goal. The result was also RB Leipzig's biggest ever win in the competition. The following month, he scored a twice in a 3–0 league win over Hertha BSC and in doing so recorded the tenth competitive brace of his career. He reached the milestone of 10 league goals for the season on 16 December after scoring twice in a 4–1 win over Mainz 05. His double against Mainz was his fifth brace of the campaign, meaning that by that stage of season every time he scored in a match he went on to score a brace. On 27 January 2019, he made his 100th appearance for RB Leipzig when he started in a 4–0 league win over Fortuna Düsseldorf. He became the first player to score 50 Bundesliga goals for the club on 4 May when he scored once and assisted another in a 3–3 draw with Mainz.

Werner scored his first Bundesliga hat-trick in a 3–1 away victory against Borussia Mönchengladbach on 30 August 2019. He made his 100th league appearance for the club on 5 October, during a 1–1 draw with Bayer Leverkusen. At the start of the following month, he scored another hat-trick and recorded three assists to guide Leipzig to an 8–0 win over Mainz, their biggest-ever win in the Bundesliga. On 23 November, he became the youngest ever player to reach the milestone of 200 Bundesliga appearances.

In his final match as a Leipzig player on 27 June 2020, Werner scored both of his side's goals in a 2–1 win away to Augsburg. Hence, he finished his tenure at Leipzig with 95 goals, to become the club's record goalscorer, overtaking Daniel Frahn.

Chelsea

On 18 June 2020, Werner agreed to sign for English Premier League club Chelsea, who activated his £47.5 million release clause, on a five-year contract. He joined the club on 1 July.
He made his league debut with the club on 14 September, in a 3–1 away win against Brighton & Hove Albion. On 29 September, Werner scored his first goal for Chelsea in a 1–1 draw against Tottenham Hotspur which they lost 4–5 on penalties in the fourth round of the EFL Cup. On 17 October, Werner scored his first Premier League goals with a brace and assisted Kai Havertz for the third as Chelsea drew Southampton 3–3 at home. On 28 October, he scored his first Champions League goal for Chelsea, a penalty against Russian side Krasnodar.

On 15 February 2021, Werner scored in a 2–0 win over Newcastle United in the Premier League and ended his 14-game goal drought in the league. On 5 May, he scored the first goal in a 2–0 win over Real Madrid, to help his team book a place in the Champions League final against fellow Premier League side Manchester City. On 29 May, he won his first-ever Champions League after Chelsea defeated Manchester City in the final in Porto.

Werner started the 2021–22 season in the 2021 UEFA Super Cup match against Villarreal on 11 August 2021, and following a 1–1 draw after extra time, Chelsea won the penalty shoot-out 6–5. He scored his first goal of the season during a Carabao Cup clash against Aston Villa. The match ended 1–1 after regular time and Chelsea eventually won 4–3 on penalties. His first Premier League goal of the season came on 2 October in a 3–1 win against Southampton. On 8 December 2021, Werner scored the fastest goal for Chelsea in their Champions League history, after only 82 seconds away to FC Zenit. He also scored a second goal in the 3–3 draw in Saint Petersburg. On 12 April 2022, he scored the third goal for Chelsea to be 3–0 ahead against Real Madrid in the second leg of the Champions League quarter-finals in the Santiago Bernabéu Stadium; however, Real Madrid managed to score a goal later on, then another goal in the extra-time, to qualify eventually to the semi-finals by winning 5–4 on aggregate.

Return to RB Leipzig
On 9 August 2022, Werner re-signed for Bundesliga club RB Leipzig on a four-year contract for a reported fee of £25.3 million. On 13 August, Werner made his return debut in a 2–2 draw against 1. FC Köln. He also scored, firing a dipping shot from outside the box at Köln keeper Marvin Schwäbe, who let it slip through his hands to gift Leipzig the opener in the 36th minute.

On 2 November 2022, Werner suffered an ankle injury and had to be substituted in Leipzig's 4–0 Champions League victory over Shakhtar Donetsk, which saw him ruled out of the 2022 FIFA World Cup in Qatar for Germany.

International career

Werner represented Germany at youth level, playing for the U15, U16, U17, U19 and U21 teams, scoring 34 goals in 48 matches overall. In 2010, he scored a hat-trick on his first appearance for Germany U15 in a match against Poland. Two years later, he was a part of the Germany team that finished runner-up in the 2012 UEFA European Under-17 Championship.

Werner was called up to the German senior squad in 2017 by head coach Joachim Löw for the friendly against England and the 2018 World Cup qualification match against Azerbaijan on 22 and 26 March 2017 respectively.

On 17 May 2017, Werner was named in Germany's squad for the 2017 FIFA Confederations Cup held in Russia. He appeared as a substitute for Sandro Wagner in the team's opening game of the tournament against Australia, before scoring his first two international goals when selected to start in Germany's final group match against Cameroon on 25 June. Four days later, Werner scored Germany's third goal in a 4–1 semi-final victory over Mexico. On 2 July 2017, Werner assisted Lars Stindl's tournament winning goal in the 2017 FIFA Confederations Cup Final against Chile. With three goals and two assists, Werner was awarded the tournament's Golden Boot.

On 4 June 2018, Werner was included in Germany's final 23-man squad for the 2018 FIFA World Cup. He made his first World Cup appearance on 17 June, starting in a 1–0 loss to Mexico in Germany's opening match. He featured in both of the remaining group stage fixtures but failed to score as Germany were eliminated at the first round for the first time since 1938.

On 19 May 2021, he was selected to the squad for the UEFA Euro 2020. On 14 June 2022, he scored a brace in a 5–2 win over Italy in the 2022–23 UEFA Nations League A, to be Italy's first time to concede at least five goals since the 6–1 defeat to Yugoslavia on 12 May 1957.

Style of play
Nicknamed "Turbo Timo", Werner is known for his acceleration and pace. A direct, hard-working, and energetic forward, he initially played as a winger in his youth, before being switched to a striker or centre-forward role. An intelligent player, he has been praised in the media for his determination and willingness to drop deep to retrieve the ball or link-up with midfielders. While he is not known for his physicality, aerial game, or hold–up play, he is a prolific goalscorer, possessing excellent movement off the ball, as well as a powerful and accurate shot with his right foot from both inside and outside the penalty area; he usually prefers to cut inside from the left flank and shoot on goal with his stronger foot, although he is also capable of cutting inside from the right and striking with his left.

Career statistics

Club

International

Germany score listed first, score column indicates score after each Werner goal

Honours
RB Leipzig
DFB-Pokal runner-up: 2018–19

Chelsea
UEFA Champions League: 2020–21
UEFA Super Cup: 2021
FIFA Club World Cup: 2021
FA Cup runner-up: 2020–21, 2021–22
EFL Cup runner-up: 2021–22

Germany
FIFA Confederations Cup: 2017

Individual
Fritz Walter Medal U17 Gold: 2013
Fritz Walter Medal U19 Silver: 2015
UEFA Champions League Breakthrough XI: 2017
FIFA Confederations Cup Golden Boot: 2017
UEFA Europa League Squad of the Season: 2017–18
Bundesliga Team of the Season: 2019–20
kicker Bundesliga Team of the Season: 2019–20
Bundesliga Player of the Month: November 2019, December 2019

References

External links

Profile at the RB Leipzig website
Profile at the German Football Association website

1996 births
Living people
Footballers from Stuttgart
German footballers
Association football forwards
VfB Stuttgart players
VfB Stuttgart II players
RB Leipzig players
Bundesliga players
3. Liga players
Premier League players
FA Cup Final players
Chelsea F.C. players
UEFA Champions League winning players
Germany youth international footballers
Germany under-21 international footballers
Germany international footballers
2017 FIFA Confederations Cup players
2018 FIFA World Cup players
UEFA Euro 2020 players
FIFA Confederations Cup-winning players
German expatriate footballers
Expatriate footballers in England
German expatriate sportspeople in England